Jhungle is a town in Gujar Khan Tehsil, Punjab, Pakistan. Jhungle is also chief town of Union Council Jhungle which is an administrative subdivision of the Tehsil.

References

Populated places in Gujar Khan Tehsil
Union councils of Gujar Khan Tehsil